Bryn Michael Ritchie (born November 28, 1979) is a former American soccer player who played professionally for two seasons.

References

External links
 University of Washington bio

1979 births
Living people
American soccer players
Washington Huskies men's soccer players
Seattle Sounders Select players
Portland Timbers (2001–2010) players
Association football defenders
Soccer players from Oregon
USL League Two players
A-League (1995–2004) players
Sportspeople from Medford, Oregon
Colorado Rapids draft picks